Jason Moodie (born 29 May 1974) is an Australian former professional rugby league footballer who played in the 1990s and 2000s. A New South Wales State of Origin representative , he played in the National Rugby League for the Newcastle Knights, Parramatta Eels and Wests Tigers.

Playing career
Moodie made his first grade debut for Newcastle in Round 2 1997 against North Sydney.  Moodie played 12 games for Newcastle in 1997 but did not play in the club's maiden premiership victory over Manly-Warringah.

Moodie joined Parramatta in 2000 and played in the club's preliminary final defeat against eventual premiers Brisbane.  

Moodie then played for the Parramatta Eels in their 2001 NRL grand final loss to the Newcastle Knights. He was selected to play for New South Wales Origin in all three games of the 2002 drawn series. Moodie scored two tries in the tied third match.

Moodie retired from first grade competition in 2004 to become a firefighter but was unsuccessful in his application to join, he then became a glass delivery driver for two years before returning to spend another season with the Wests Tigers in 2007.

References

External links
 Wests Tigers player profile

1974 births
Living people
Australian rugby league players
Indigenous Australian rugby league players
Newcastle Knights players
Wests Tigers players
Parramatta Eels players
Country New South Wales Origin rugby league team players
New South Wales Rugby League State of Origin players
Rugby league wingers
People from the North West Slopes
Rugby league players from Narrabri